Lo mein is a Chinese dish with  egg noodles. It often contains vegetables and some type of meat or seafood, usually beef, chicken, pork, or shrimp. It might also be served with wontons (called húntun 餛飩/馄饨 in Mandarin), and it can also be eaten with just vegetables.

Etymology
The term lo mein comes from the Cantonese lou1 min6, meaning "stirred noodles". The Cantonese use of the character 撈, pronounced lou1 and meaning "to stir", in its casual form, differs from the character's traditional Han meaning of "to dredge" or "to scoop out of water" in Mandarin, in which case it would be pronounced as laau4 or lou4 in Cantonese (lāo in Mandarin). In Mandarin, the dish is called lāo miàn. In its country of origin, it is made of thin flour-and-egg noodles which are notable for their elastic texture.

Regional variations

Northern China
In northern China, bàn miàn (拌面) can refer to many other types of wheat noodles without egg, including laghman in Xinjiang.

American Chinese cuisine
In American Chinese restaurants, lo mein is a popular take-out food and is sometimes considered synonymous with chow mein. The dish is distinct from both Cantonese lo mein and Cantonese crispy chow mein. Cantonese lo mein is stirred with a thin sauce and items such as wonton or beef brisket added on top. In contrast, U.S. lo mein noodles are usually stir-fried with a sauce made from soy sauce and other seasonings. Vegetables such as bok choy and cabbage can be mixed in and meats like roast pork, beef or chicken are often added. Shrimp lo mein, lobster lo mein, vegetable lo mein, and "house" lo mein (more than one meat) are sometimes available.

Indonesian Chinese cuisine
In Indonesian Chinese cuisine, lo mein is made using egg noodles or "mie hokkien".

See also

Chinese noodles
Chow mein
Lamian
Lomi
Pancit
Pho
Ramen
Stir fry
Yakisoba

References

American Chinese cuisine
Canadian Chinese cuisine
Cantonese cuisine
Cantonese words and phrases
Chinese noodle dishes
Mixed noodles
Guyanese cuisine